Sir George Snigge (1544/45 – 11 November 1617) was an English lawyer and politician who sat in the House of Commons at various times between 1589 and 1605.

Snigge was the son and heir of George Snigge (died 1582) who was Mayor of Bristol in 1575. He became a student of Christ Church, Oxford in 1564, and was awarded BA on 25 June 1566. He was admitted a student of the Middle Temple on 9 August 1567 and was called to the bar on 17 June 1575.

In 1568, Snigge was elected Member of Parliament for Cricklade in Wiltshire. He was Autumn Reader for his Inn in 1590 and became Recorder of Bristol in 1593. In 1597 he was elected MP for Bristol. He was Double Lent Reader in 1599. In 1601 he was re-elected MP for Bristol. He was Treasurer of his Inn in May 1602 and was made a Serjeant-at-law  in the Easter term of 1604. He was knighted about this time. In 1604 he was re-elected MP for Bristol until 1605 when he became a Baron of the Court of Exchequer. He took office  on 28 June 1605 and held the office until his death. On 13 May 1608 he was additionally made Chief Justice of the Great Sessions for  Breconshire, Glamorgan and Radnorshire at a salary of £50 a year and held the post until February 1617.

Snigge died at the age of 72 in London and lay in state for six weeks at Merchant Taylors Hall in Broad Street before he was buried on 23 December 1617  in St Stephen's Church, Bristol.

Snigge married  Alice Young, daughter of William Young of Ogbourne, Wiltshire.

References

 

1540s births
1617 deaths
Alumni of Christ Church, Oxford
Members of the Middle Temple
Serjeants-at-law (England)
English MPs 1589
English MPs 1597–1598
English MPs 1601
English MPs 1604–1611
16th-century English lawyers
Members of Parliament for Cricklade